San Marino competed at the 2015 World Aquatics Championships in Kazan, Russia from 24 July to 9 August 2015.

Swimming

Sammarinese swimmers have achieved qualifying standards in the following events (up to a maximum of 2 swimmers in each event at the A-standard entry time, and 1 at the B-standard):

Women

References

External links
San Marino Swimming Federation 

Nations at the 2015 World Aquatics Championships
2015 in San Marino
San Marino at the World Aquatics Championships